Pertti Tiainen (born 15 November 1954) is a Finnish long-distance runner. He competed in the marathon at the 1984 Summer Olympics.

References

1954 births
Living people
Athletes (track and field) at the 1984 Summer Olympics
Finnish male long-distance runners
Finnish male marathon runners
Olympic athletes of Finland
Place of birth missing (living people)